Gregory Alan Mackie  is a South Australian cultural advocate and entrepreneur who has worked to promote the arts and culture in Australia. He was an elected Councillor at the Adelaide City Council (2000-2003, May 2020 - June 2022). He was co-founder and was managing director of independent bookshop Imprints Booksellers (1984–2007), served  on many public bodies, including Arts SA and Adelaide Writers' Week, and founded the Adelaide Festival of Ideas in 1999. 

 he is CEO of the History Trust of South Australia, after being appointed to the position in 2016.

Career
From 1984 until 2003 Mackie was director and co-proprietor of Adelaide's leading independent literary book retailer, Imprints Booksellers.

Mackie served for a decade with the Adelaide Writers' Week literary festival Advisory Committee, including four years as its chair (1994–98), and in 1999 he founded the Adelaide Festival of Ideas.

During his years of running Imprints, he also served in many board and other advocacy roles in the community and cultural benefit sectors, including as President of the Adelaide West End Association, the FEAST Adelaide Lesbian and Gay Cultural Festival, as a Trustee of the Adelaide Festival Centre Trust, and member of the Libraries Board of South Australia.

He has also served on the Council of the University of South Australia, and was an inaugural member of the Dame Roma Mitchell Trust Fund for Children and Young People. Working with the Premier of South Australia, Mike Rann and the Minister for Disability, Mackie established the Richard Llewellyn Arts and Disability Trust Fund. He also served on the Board of Management of the Don Dunstan Foundation, and later as one of its patrons.

In May 2000 he was elected to the Adelaide City Council and served in that capacity until May 2003. During that period Mackie developed the first Adelaide City Arts and Living Culture Strategy and played a leading role to improve relations with the Aboriginal community. He developed a City Flags Policy that ensured the permanent flying of the Aboriginal Flag alongside the national flag in Victoria Square, and became a leading proponent of the Victoria Square and Central West Redevelopment Strategy. In May 2003 local government elections Mackie contested the Lord Mayoralty of the City of Adelaide.

Mackie commenced service as executive director of Arts SA in January 2004, a role in which he worked hard to grow the state's festivals culture.

In September 2008 he became acting Deputy Chief Executive of the Department of Premier and Cabinet. He was appointed Acting Chief Executive for two extended periods. In January 2009, Mackie chaired the State Emergency Management Committee, co-ordinating the state's response to a major heatwave emergency. As Deputy Chief Executive, his responsibilities included Arts SA, SafeWork SA, Aboriginal Affairs and Reconciliation, Capital City Committee Directorate, the Adelaide Thinkers in Residence Program and State Records. During this period he also established The Australian Centre for Social Innovation (TACSI) and the Integrated Design Commission SA.

In 2008, Mackie was appointed by Quentin Bryce, Governor-General of Australia, as a member of the Council of the Order of Australia, a role in which he served until 2013. From 2008 to 2013, he served as Chairman of the South Australian Premier's Communications Advisory Group (PCAG), the state's watchdog on tax-payer funded advertising. 

In January 2012, at the invitation of Minister for the Arts, Health and Ageing, Hon John Hill MP, Mackie took on the role of "ageing provocateur" as executive director, Office for the Ageing. 

In February 2013 he left the SA Public Sector and from September 2013 to August 2014 served as CEO with Sydney-based not-for-profit network, Place Leaders Asia-Pacific Ltd. 

He has served as a member of the board of Volunteering SA&NT and of Soundstream New Music Collective, was Chairman of the board of Festival Fleurieu (a biennial arts festival in the district of Yankalilla) and from July 2015, as chair of the board of Adelaide Festival of Ideas Association Inc. In June 2014 he was appointed a member of the Australia Council for the Arts' Major Performing Arts Panel. 

In March 2016 Mackie was appointed CEO of the History Trust of South Australia (formerly History SA), with effect from the end of April 2016. He is still in the position .

He is (was?) a Trustee of Palya Fund and a member of the Ngeringa Arts Advisory Board.

Mackie has also been a member of the external advisory panel to the Assemblage Centre for Creative Arts at Flinders University, headed by Garry Stewart, along with Jo Dyer, Wesley Enoch, Rebecca Summerton, and others.

In May 2020 Mackie was once again elected to the City of Adelaide council, this time as a result of a by-election. He resigned in June 2022, citing the “corrosive nature” and “relentless domination of the Team Adelaide faction”.

Honours and awards
2002 – Medal of the Order of Australia, "For service to the community through the promotion of the arts, particularly the Adelaide Festival of Ideas."
2006 – Flinders University  Distinguished Alumni Award
2007 – Australia Business Arts Foundation (AbaF) Dame Elisabeth Murdoch Cultural Leadership Award, in recognition of his efforts to promote business partnership with the arts
2015 – Inaugural  Jim Bettison and Helen James Award.

References

Further reading
Finding the Next Wave: Innovation and its Discontents University of Adelaide Cultural Oration 2017, by Greg Mackie OAM – Delivered 13 July 2017

People from Adelaide
Culture of Adelaide
1959 births
Living people
Public servants of South Australia